Saint Michael's of the Ridge Roman Catholic Church is a church within the Toledo Diocese of the Roman Catholic Church. The church is located on Moser Road about six miles northeast of Defiance, Ohio.

See also
 Saint Michael: Roman Catholic traditions and views

References

Churches in the Roman Catholic Diocese of Toledo